Lesbian, gay, bisexual, and transgender (LGBT) people in Mato Grosso do Sul, Brazil enjoy many of the same legal protections available to non-LGBT people. Homosexuality is legal in the state.

Laws against discrimination
Mato Grosso do Sul was among the first states in Brazil to enact a state constitution banning discrimination on the basis of sexual orientation, doing so in 1989 alongside the state of Sergipe.

Same-sex unions
On 2 April 2013, the Court of Mato Grosso do Sul authorizes marriage between same-sex couples in the state

References

Mato Grosso do Sul
Mato Grosso do Sul